The Bonhoeffer Botanical Gardens are a botanical garden located  north of Seattle. They are named in honor of Dietrich Bonhoeffer, a Lutheran pastor and scholar, who was executed in April, 1945, in Nazi Germany's Flossenburg concentration camp.

The garden contains native plants of the Pacific Northwest.

References

External links
 Official website

Botanical gardens in Washington (state)
Lutheran churches in Washington (state)